Frieda Adelle Murray is an American fantasy writer whose works are generally written in collaboration with Roland J. Green. She writes as Frieda A. Murray.

Life
Murray was born September 17, 1948 in Waco, McLennan County, Texas, the daughter of Samuel Stevenson Murray and Frieda Rhone Murray. She moved to Chicago, Illinois from Washington, D.C. in 1966; she still lives there. She married Roland J. Green in 1975. They have one daughter, Violette Y. Green, born in 1984.

Bibliography

Novels
The Book of Kantela (1985) with Roland J. Green

Short stories
"A Devil Unknown" (1994) with Roland J. Green
"A Song Will Rise" (1995) with Roland J. Green
"Sir William, He Lay Snug" (1995) with Roland J. Green
"She Who Might Be Obeyed" (1995) with Roland J. Green
"Enchanter Kiev" (1995) with Roland J. Green
"Chozzerai" (1996) with Roland J. Green
"To Speak with Men and Angels" (1996) with Roland J. Green
"The Winds They Did Blow High" (2001)

References

External links

Living people
American fantasy writers
People from Waco, Texas
Writers from Chicago
20th-century American women writers
21st-century American women writers
20th-century American novelists
21st-century American writers
Women science fiction and fantasy writers
American women novelists
1949 births
Novelists from Illinois